{
  "type": "ExternalData",
  "service": "geoline",
  "ids": "Q4873303",
  "properties": {
    "stroke": "#FF0000",
    "stroke-width": 6
  }
}

Port Klang Line is one of the three KTM Komuter Central Sector lines provided by Keretapi Tanah Melayu.

KTM Komuter is an electrified commuter train service first introduced in 1995, catering especially to commuters in Kuala Lumpur and the surrounding suburban areas. It is a popular mode of transportation for commuters working in Kuala Lumpur, as they can travel to the city without the hassle of traffic congestion. Coaches are modern and air-conditioned. For those who drive to the stations/halts, 'Park & Ride' facility is provided at a nominal charge.

The line is one of the components of the Klang Valley Integrated Transit System. The line is numbered  and coloured Red on official transit maps. It is named after its terminus, Port Klang station.

Line information

History
The line began as the Selangor Government Railway which connected Bukit Kuda just outside Klang to Kuala Lumpur, opened in September 1886. In 1890 a bridge across the Klang River was constructed, allowing the railway to be re-routed to Bukit Badak and henceforth towards downtown Klang. The line was extended towards Segambut and Rawang in 1892, as a branch line from the Resident station. The railway reached Kuala Kubu Bharu in 1894 and finally Port Klang in 1899.

In 1989 railbus services were offered on the Sentul-Port Klang stretch. The same stretch, along with the Rawang-Seremban stretch, were electrified in the 1990s. Electrification was later extended to Batu Caves in 2009.

During colonial rule, there used to be a branch line from Padang Jawa to Kuala Selangor; the branch line was dismantled between 1931 and 1934.

At present, the Port Klang Line is the oldest existing (and still operational) railway line in the country, taking the title after the Taiping-Port Weld line was dismantled in 1987.

Stations

KTM Komuter Trial Route
A new route for KTM Komuter services was introduced in preparation of the infrastructure upgrading works in the Klang Valley Double Tracking project in April 2016. It aimed to increase the frequency and the smooth running of the KTM ETS, KTM Komuter, KTM Intercity & Freight at the Central Sector.

The original Port Klang Line from Batu Caves-Port Klang was changed to Rawang-Port Klang effective 15 December 2015.

Former Rawang—Tanjung Malim shuttle service
The KTM Komuter service was expanded to include three new stations beyond Rawang on April 21, 2007 under what was then known as the Rawang-Rasa shuttle service. The stations were Serendah, Batang Kali, and Rasa.

This 22 km stretch was the first portion of the Rawang-Ipoh double tracking and electrification project to become operational. The service was extended to Kuala Kubu Bharu on January 5, 2008. It was further extended to Tanjung Malim on June 1, 2009 and the service was renamed as the Rawang-Tanjung Malim shuttle service.

Until 11 July 2016, passengers had to disembark at Rawang and transfer to the Rawang-Tanjung Malim shuttle service for stations north of Rawang. Service ran at 30 minutes interval. The first and last trains to leave Rawang are at 05:42 and 21:24 while the first and last trains leaving Tanjung Malim are at 05:42 and 21:54. Journey time between Rawang and Tanjung Malim is 45 minutes.

Beginning 12 July 2016, the Rawang-Tanjung Malim shuttle was terminated and was fully integrated into the Port Klang Line as a through service, with trains running all the way to Tanjung Malim.

Skypark Link

Since May 2018 there is a branch line of the Port Klang Line - known as Skypark Link - that serves the Subang Airport. Branded as an express service, the line shares tracks with ordinary Port Klang Line services between KL Sentral and Terminal Skypark without stopping at the stations in between. The line branches off to Subang Airport after Subang Jaya station.

Service suspension at city centre and Segambut stations

Beginning 3 June 2018, Port Klang Line services at three stations in downtown Kuala Lumpur - Putra station, Bank Negara station and the old Kuala Lumpur station, as well as the Segambut station will be unavailable during off-peak hours, i.e. between 8 am and 6 pm, to facilitate track upgrading services.

For the three city-centre stations - Putra, Bank Negara and Kuala Lumpur, Port Klang-bound trains will serve the stations between 06:30 and 07:50, while Tanjong Malim-bound trains will call at the stations between 17:45 and 19:45.

For Segambut station, only six trains will serve the station everyday: three towards Tanjong Malim in the morning, and three towards Port Klang in the evening. Free shuttle buses on the route KTM3, provided by rapidKL, provides a link between Segambut station and KL Sentral.

During off-peak hours, trains will only shuttle between KL Sentral and Port Klang, and between Tanjong Malim and Kepong stations only. An hourly shuttle service between Klang and Setia Jaya is also introduced. Passengers can still connect to Kuala Lumpur city centre on the MRT Kajang Line (SBK Line) at Sungai Buloh and Muzium Negara, or on the LRT Kelana Jaya Line at Subang Jaya and Abdullah Hukum.

Future expansion
An infill station between the old Kuala Lumpur station and Bank Negara station, planned to serve the PDRM headquarters at Bukit Aman, is being studied.

Rolling stock 
The line uses KTM Class 92 trains in 6 car formations.

Gallery

See also
Keretapi Tanah Melayu
KTM Intercity
KTM West Coast Line
KTM East Coast Line
KTM ETS
KTM Komuter
Seremban Line
Port Klang Line
 Northern Sector
Malaysian Railway System

References

External links 
Keretapi Tanah Melayu official website
KTM Komuter official website
Keretapi.com - Railway Fan website
Keretapi Tanah Melayu Railway Fan Club website
KTM Komuter Schedule App: Solving The Main Problem for KTM Komuter Customers

1995 establishments in Malaysia
 
Metre gauge railways in Malaysia